The  opened in Kanazawa, Ishikawa Prefecture, Japan in 2011. Dedicated to the life, writings, and ideas of Kanazawa-born Buddhist philosopher D. T. Suzuki, the facility, designed by Yoshio Taniguchi, includes a contemplative space overlooking the Water Mirror Garden.

See also

 An Introduction to Zen Buddhism
 Ishikawa Prefectural History Museum
 Ishikawa Prefectural Museum of Art
 21st Century Museum of Contemporary Art, Kanazawa
 Kenroku-en

References

External links
 D. T. Suzuki Museum

Buildings and structures in Kanazawa, Ishikawa
Museums in Ishikawa Prefecture
Biographical museums in Japan
Literary museums in Japan
Museums established in 2011
2011 establishments in Japan